The Novena of Grace is a Catholic devotion in honor of Saint Francis Xavier. It is usually performed from March 4 to March 12.

History

In Naples in 1633, Fr. Marcello Mastrilli, S.J. took a vow asking to be assigned Japan during the Buddhist persecution. 

While waiting for the passage to Japan, Mastrilli organized on a grand scale the feast of the Immaculate Conception in the College of Naples, putting up for the occasion an elaborate structure that drew the admiration of the whole town . The feast was a stupendous success that helped so much to bring home to the faithful the great privilege of Our Lady, which then was not yet defined as a dogma of the faith.

As Fr. Mastrilli supervised the removal of the temporary structure, a hammer slipped from the hands of a worker and fell on his head. The injury caused was severe, and Fr. Mastrilli was on the verge of death. St. Francis Xavier appeared to Fr. Mastrilli asking him to renew the vow to go to Japan:

"All those who implore my help daily for nine consecutive days, from the fourth to the twelfth of March inclusive and worthily receive the Sacraments of Penance and Holy Communion on one of the nine days will experience my protection and may hope with entire assurance to obtain from God any Grace they ask that is for the good of their souls and the glory of God."  

Afterwards, Fr. Mastrilli arose entirely cured. Faithful to his vow, he led a band of thirty-three Jesuits to Japan. When they arrived, Fr. Mastrilli was seized and condemned from October 5 to 17 and died a martyr.

Before leaving for Japan, Fr. Mastrilli widely published the news of his cure and vision. Thus the devotion spread far and wide .

Prayer 
The Novena prayer:

"Most amiable and most loving Saint Francis Xavier, in union with thee I reverently adore the Divine Majesty. I rejoice exceedingly on account of the marvelous gifts which God bestowed upon thee. I thank God for the special graces He gave thee during thy life on earth and for the great glory that came to thee after thy death. I implore thee to obtain for me, through thy powerful intercession, the greatest of all blessings--that of living and dying in the state of grace. I also beg of thee to secure for me the special favor I ask in this novena. (Here you may mention the grace, spiritual or temporal, that you wish to obtain.) In asking this favor, I am fully resigned to the Divine Will. I pray and desire only to obtain that which is most conducive to the greater glory of God and the greater good of my soul."

It is then customary to say:

V. Pray for us, Saint Francis Xavier.
R. That we may be made worthy of the promises of Christ.

O God, Who didst vouchsafe, by the preaching and miracles of Saint Francis Xavier, to join unto Thy Church the nations of the Indies, grant, we beseech Thee, that we who reverence his glorious merits may also imitate his example, through Jesus Christ Our Lord. Amen.

Then add 3 Our Father's and 3 Hail Mary's in memory of Saint Francis Xavier's devotion to the Most Holy Trinity, and Glory be to the Father 10 times in thanksgiving for the graces received during his 10 years of apostleship.

See also 
 Novena

References

Sources 
 Frs. P. de Mattei, S.J. & F.X. Rocca, S.J., Novena of Grace To St. Francis Xavier, Catholic Book Crusade, Patna, 1944. No copyright mentioned. Imprimatur: Leo Proserpio, S.J., Episc. Calicutensis, Calicut, April 15, 1944.

External links 
 Biographical episodes and reflections for praying a Novena of grace at Sacred Space web presence of the Society of Jesus' Irish province
 Novena of Grace modern format for personal intercessory prayer.

Roman Catholic prayers